Serghei Belous (born 21 November 1971) is a former Moldovan footballer, who played as midfielder.

International goals

Honours
Tiligul-Tiras Tiraspol
Moldovan Cup (3): 1993, 1994, 1995

Sheriff Tiraspol
 Divizia Națională (1): 2003–04

References

External links 
 
 
 International matches of Serghei Belous at scoreshelf.com
 
 

1971 births
Living people
Association football midfielders
Moldovan footballers
Moldova international footballers
Moldovan Super Liga players
Moldovan expatriate footballers
Expatriate footballers in Georgia (country)
Moldovan expatriate sportspeople in Georgia (country)
Expatriate footballers in Russia
Moldovan expatriate sportspeople in Russia
CS Tiligul-Tiras Tiraspol players
FC Tiraspol players
FC Sheriff Tiraspol players